Christine Marie Allado (born July 15, 1995) is a Filipina-British actress and singer. She is best known for her performance in the role of Peggy Schuyler and Maria Reynolds in the multi Tony and Olivier award-winning West End Production of Hamilton: An American Musical and for starring as Vanessa in the multi Olivier award-winning West End production of In The Heights, both by Lin Manuel Miranda. Her television credits include starring in the BBC's 60th anniversary production of West Side Story as the lead role of Maria and Jasmine in Hallmark Channel's TV film Royal Hearts, as Agent Beverly Walker for The Accidental Spy. She is currently starring in “The Prince of Egypt” musical at the Dominion Theatre in the West End.

Early life and education
Allado is the daughter of Jojo Allado and Letty Guevara. She attended the University of the Philippines and Playshop school theatre workshops, and performed in several productions there including Hairspray, The Phantom of the Opera, Joseph and the Amazing Technicolor Dreamcoat, etc.

Career 
Allado moved to Hong Kong at age 18 and went to work as a performer for Hong Kong Disneyland. She moved again to London, United Kingdom, and enrolled in musical theatre at the Royal Academy of Music.

Allado's first theatre role in London's West End was in Tim Rice's From Here To Eternity at the Shaftesbury Theatre, taking on the role of Minerva and serving as understudy for the lead Lorene. She later had roles in a production of Fat Boy Slim and David Byrne's Here Lies Love, which was transferred from the Public Theater in New York to the National Theatre in London. She performed the role of Ursula in Sweet Charity at the Royal Exchange Theatre and the title role in the show Turandot, staged by the Tête à Tête opera company.

She headlined Magic of the Musicals at the Royal Albert Hall for Magic Radio, which was broadcast live and streamed worldwide.

In 2016, Allado performed with Italian opera singer Andrea Bocelli at a concert at the Mall of Asia Arena in the Philippines. That year she was a finalist on Britain's Got Talent on ITV as part of four-member girl band Zyrah. They were previously signed to Universal Records and have released four No.1 singles on the iTunes charts. She sings the lead role of Constance for the original West End Recording of The Clockmaker's Daughter

In 2017, Allado took on the role of Peggy in the London production of Hamilton: An American Musical. The show has gained considerable critical acclaim, and Allado's performance has received many positive reviews from renowned US and UK based publications.

Allado played the role of Tzipporah in The Prince of Egypt musical on the stage of the Dominion Theatre, London's West End.

Discography

Zyrah - 2014 - Assassins Creed, Game of Thrones, I See Fire, Oblivion

The Clockmaker's Daughter - 2019 - Original Studio Cast Recording

References

External links 
 https://www.christineallado.live

1995 births
Living people
Actresses from Manila
Filipino stage actresses
21st-century Filipino actresses
Filipino emigrants to England
21st-century British actresses
British stage actresses